TRANUS is an integrated land use and transport modeling system. It is used to simulate and evaluate public policies in the areas of transportation, urban, and regional planning. TRANUS has been applied to a large number of cities and regions throughout the world in Latin America, the United States, Europe and Asia. The modeling system is developed and maintained by Modelistica, a Venezuelan group. Development of the system began in 1982, with the first practical applications since 1985. It is free software under Creative Commons BY-SA 2.0 license. The theory supporting the model is described in the book "Integrated Land Use and Transport Modelling: Decision Chains and Hierarchies"  by Tomas de la Barra.

Features 

TRANUS is computer system used to simulate activity location, land use, the real estate market, and the transportation system. It is used for the analysis of alternative policies or projects at an urban or regional scale. It is a fully integrated system, although the transport model may be used as stand-alone.

The system may be applied to any scale, from detailed urban to large metropolitan regions, to states or provinces, to whole countries.

The transport model is flexible and can be used to represent the movements of both passengers and freight. The model operates on a single multimodal network and performs elastic trip generation and a combined modal split and assignment process. It is the only free transport model available today. 

All models in the system use discrete choice logit models, linked together in a consistent way. This includes activity-location, land-choice, and most notably, multimodal path choice and assignment. This scheme is considerably superior to conventional transport models based on equilibrium assignment and separate private/public modes.

The software includes a powerful graphical user interface with geographical coordinates, an object-oriented database and explicit representation of scenarios. Powerful network editing tools are also included. Data may be imported or exported to/from other databases and models.

Economic and environmental evaluation are embedded in the software and are consistent with the models.

Availability 
The programs runs on any version of the Windows operating system. Recent versions of the model programs compile with GNU Fortran and have been tested to run on Ubuntu Linux. The GUI (called TUS) has been tested to run on Linux using recent versions of Wine.

The software and its source code may be downloaded freely from its Google Code project page. In-depth documentation and tutorials are available at the TRANUS web site, along with sample applications in English and Spanish. There is an online forum where users share their experiences with TRANUS.

TRANUS is open-source software under a Creative Commons Attribution-ShareAlike 2.0 license.

Applications and research 
Below is a list of applications and research that have used TRANUS.
 Using TRANUS to Construct a Land Use-Transportation-Emissions Model of Charlotte, North Carolina
 Evaluation System of Policy Measure Alternatives for a Metropolis Based on TRANUS from the Viewpoint of Sustainability (PDF)

References

External links
https://bitbucket.org/apalala/tranus/

Free simulation software
Traffic simulation